Lupettiana mordax is a species of ghost spider in the family Anyphaenidae. It is found in a range from the United States to Peru and Brazil.

References

Anyphaenidae
Articles created by Qbugbot
Spiders described in 1896